Nisar Ahmed is a Pakistani cricketer. He made his List A debut on 20 January 2017 for Federally Administered Tribal Areas in the 2016–17 Regional One Day Cup.

References

External links
 

Year of birth missing (living people)
Living people
Pakistani cricketers
Federally Administered Tribal Areas cricketers
Place of birth missing (living people)